Hilal is an elevated station on the Fahrettin Altay—Evka 3 Line of the İzmir Metro in Konak. Located above the Turkish State Railways' Hilal junction, it is one of the ten original stations of the metro system. Connection to İZBAN commuter trains are available at Hilal railway station. Since Hilal is located in the middle of a railway junction, no direct connections to ESHOT city bus service is available.

Hilal station was opened on 22 May 2000.

Layout

Hilal is one of two elevated stations on the İzmir Metro, along with Stadyum, and consists of two side platforms with two tracks. Directly beneath the station, on ground level, is the mezzanine with fare control and ticket machines. Since the station itself is located within the Hilal junction, the surrounding streets are accessible via walkways and bridges over the railway tracks in the junction. Connection to the northbound İZBAN platform are located at the west end of the mezzanine; while a walkway north to Akıncılar Avenue continues past the northbound platform. Connection to the southbound İZBAN platform are available via an elevated walkway over the İZBAN tracks. From this walkway, another elevated walkway diverges off to the Hilal neighborhood.

References

İzmir Metro
Railway stations opened in 2000
2000 establishments in Turkey
Railway stations in İzmir Province